Jack Baker (1890 – 1947) was an Australian rugby league footballer who played in the 1910s and 1920s. He played in the NSWRFL premiership for the North Sydney and South Sydney clubs.  His position was at second-row.

Playing career
Baker made his first grade debut for South Sydney against Annandale in Round 2 1919 which finished in an 8–8 draw at Wentworth Park.  Baker spent two years at Souths before signing with North Sydney.

Baker was a member of Norths only premiership victories in 1921 and 1922.  He played in the 1922 grand final against Glebe where Norths won 35–3 at The Sydney Cricket Ground.

Post playing
After retirement, Baker worked as a police sergeant.

Death
Baker died while living at North Sydney in 1947.

References

1890 births
1947 deaths
Australian police officers
Australian rugby league players
North Sydney Bears players
Rugby league players from New South Wales
Rugby league second-rows
South Sydney Rabbitohs players
Date of birth missing